Dancing in the Dark is the seventh studio album led by jazz pianist and mathematician Rob Schneiderman, released on the Reservoir label in 1998.

Reception

In his review on AllMusic, Michael G. Nastos stated "For his seventh Reservoir disc, pianist Schneiderman has assembled a quintet that takes on a distinct Jazz Messengers persona. Trumpeter Brian Lynch and baritone saxophonist Gary Smulyan supply a rich wellspring of swing and flowing ideas, while bassist Rufus Reid and drummer Billy Hart simply cannot be topped in their rhythmic supremacy.

Track listing

Track listing adapted from AllMusic.

Credits

 Billy Hart - Drums
 Brian Lynch - Trumpet
 Rufus Reid - Bass
 Rob Schneiderman - Piano 
 Gary Smulyan – Baritone Saxophone
 B. Robert Johnson - Design, Photography
 Rudy Van Gelder - Engineer [Recording]
 Maureen Sickler - Engineer [Assistant]
 Kayla Feldman - Executive-Producer
 Zan Stewart - Liner notes
 Abigail Feldman - Cover Photography
 Mark Feldman - Producer

References

Rob Schneiderman albums
1998 albums
Reservoir Records albums
Albums recorded at Van Gelder Studio